Matthew Hoffman may refer to:

 Mat Hoffman (born 1972), American BMX rider
 Matthew Hoffman (murderer) (born 1980), American convicted murderer
  Matthew Hoffman, television host notable for being on the cover of the Death Grips EP Interview 2016